Dil Hai Ke Manta Nahin is a 1991 Indian Hindi-language romantic comedy film produced by Gulshan Kumar and directed by Mahesh Bhatt. The film starred Bhatt's daughter Pooja Bhatt in her first major lead female role, while the lead male role was played by Aamir Khan. Supporting roles were played by Anupam Kher, Sameer Chitre, and Tiku Talsania, while Deepak Tijori made a special appearance.

Dil Hai Ke Manta Nahin plot was inspired from the 1934 Hollywood film It Happened One Night starring Clark Gable and Claudette Colbert,. In turn, Dil Hai Ke Manta Nahin was remade in Tamil as Kadhal Rojavae (2000). The Kannada movie Hudugaata (2007) was also inspired by the same American film.

The movie was a box office success and boosted the career of newcomer Pooja Bhatt while cementing Aamir Khan's status as a leading movie star.  The film's soundtrack, with music by Nadeem–Shravan, was also praised.

Plot
Pooja Dharamchand is the daughter of a rich Bombay shipping tycoon, Seth Dharamchand. She is head-over-heels in love with movie star Deepak Kumar, but her father strongly disapproves of their courtship. One night, Pooja escapes from her father's yacht and hops onto a bus to Bangalore to be with Deepak, who is shooting for a film there. Meanwhile, Seth Dharamchand, realizing his daughter has run away, dispatches private detectives to locate her.

Aboard the bus, Pooja meets Raghu Jetley, a loud-mouth journalist who has just lost his job. He offers to help her in exchange for an exclusive story on her, which would revive his flagging career. Pooja is forced to agree to his demands, as he threatens to let her father know of her whereabouts should she not comply. After both of them happen to miss the bus, Raghu and Pooja go through various adventures together and find themselves falling in love with one another.

Raghu desires to marry Pooja, but knows that financially he is in no shape to do so.  Pooja also falls for Raghu and she decides to go with him, but a misunderstanding leads her to believe that Raghu was just looking for a story and not her love.

She calls it quits, returns home and agrees to marry Deepak. However, her father learns about Raghu when he comes to him to take back his money, spent by Raghu on Pooja on his way to Bangalore. He realizes how Raghu has taken care of Pooja during the trip. Pooja misunderstands him and believes that he might have come for the reward announced by her rich father. At last her father tells Pooja that Raghu is the right man for her and that he has not come for the reward. On the wedding day she realizes that Raghu really loves her and then runs away from the marriage mandap (hall) to Raghu with her father's support.

Cast

Awards 
37th Filmfare Awards:

Won
Best Female Playback Singer – Anuradha Paudwal for "Dil Hai Ki Manta Nahin"
Nominated
 Best Film – Robin Bhatt and Sharad Joshi
 Best Director – Mahesh Bhatt
 Best Actor – Aamir Khan
 Best Comedian – Anupam Kher
 Best Lyricist – Anwar Sagar for "Dil Hai Ke Manta Nahin"

Soundtrack 

The soundtrack of the movie is composed by the music director duo Nadeem-Shravan. The song lyrics were written by Sameer, Faaiz Anwar, Rani Malik and Aziz Khan. All the songs are sung by Anuradha Paudwal, along with co-singers Kumar Sanu, Abhijeet, Babla Mehta and Debashish Dasgupta. On first release of audio, all the songs were originally voiced by Babla Mehta, but later was released with Kumar Sanu replacing Mehta, except "Galyat Sankali Sonyachi" sung by Mehta and "Dil Tujhpe Aa Gaya" sung by Abhijeet. The album became very popular in India with tracks like the title track and "Tu Pyaar Hai Kisi Aur Ka" being very successful tracks in the 90s, and still are iconic till date. It was the 5th highest-selling Bollywood soundtrack of 1991 with 2.5 million units sold

References

External links

1990s Hindi-language films
Indian road movies
Films scored by Nadeem–Shravan
Indian remakes of American films
Films directed by Mahesh Bhatt
Hindi films remade in other languages
1991 romantic drama films
Indian romantic drama films
Films with screenplays by Robin Bhatt
T-Series (company) films